Daiki Watari (渡 大生, born 25 June 1993) is a Japanese footballer who plays as a forward for  club Tokushima Vortis.

Club statistics
.

References

External links
Profile at Sanfrecce Hiroshima
Profile at Tokushima Vortis

1993 births
Living people
Association football people from Hiroshima Prefecture
Japanese footballers
J1 League players
J2 League players
Giravanz Kitakyushu players
Tokushima Vortis players
Sanfrecce Hiroshima players
Oita Trinita players
Avispa Fukuoka players
Association football forwards